The 1922 Chicago Cardinals season was their third in the league. The team improved on their previous output of 3–3–2, winning eight games. They finished third in the league.

Schedule

Standings

References

Arizona Cardinals seasons
Chicago Cardinals
Chicago